Jonathan Ramis (born 6 November 1989) is a Uruguayan footballer who plays for Cerro Largo.

Club careers
Ramis began his career in 2008 with Peñarol. He was loaned to Cádiz on a half year loan deal in January 2010.

Ramis moved to Chinese Super League side Nanchang Hengyuan on a one-year loan deal in January 2011.

In July 2010, Ramis moved to the second division to play for Aldosivi.

In December 2015, it was announced that Ramis would join Ascenso MX team, Zacatepec on loan, after being on loan at Racing de Montevideo.

References

External links
 

1989 births
Living people
People from Artigas, Uruguay
Uruguayan footballers
Uruguayan expatriate footballers
Uruguayan Primera División players
Chinese Super League players
Ecuadorian Serie A players
Liga MX players
Argentine Primera División players
Primera Nacional players
Cádiz CF players
Peñarol players
L.D.U. Quito footballers
Shanghai Shenxin F.C. players
C.A. Bella Vista players
Centro Atlético Fénix players
Aldosivi footballers
Godoy Cruz Antonio Tomba footballers
Club Universidad Nacional footballers
Racing Club de Montevideo players
Club Atlético Belgrano footballers
Club Atlético Vélez Sarsfield footballers
Club Atlético Tigre footballers
C.A. Progreso players
Cerro Largo F.C. players
Uruguayan expatriate sportspeople in China
Uruguayan expatriate sportspeople in Spain
Uruguayan expatriate sportspeople in Ecuador
Uruguayan expatriate sportspeople in Mexico
Uruguayan expatriate sportspeople in Argentina
Expatriate footballers in Spain
Expatriate footballers in China
Expatriate footballers in Argentina
Expatriate footballers in Ecuador
Expatriate footballers in Mexico
Association football midfielders